Colliano is a town and comune in the province of Salerno in the Campania region of south-western Italy. The name is likely related to the Italian word, collinare, which means hill top.

History

Geography
The municipality borders with Buccino, Contursi Terme, Laviano, Muro Lucano (PZ, Basilicata region), Oliveto Citra, Palomonte, San Gregorio Magno and Valva.

See also
Collianello
Piano di Pecore

References

External links

Cities and towns in Campania
Localities of Cilento